Tiago Amaral, mostly known by his stage name TAY (born 17 February 1999), is a Portuguese trap and R&B singer and a self taught dancer.

Career 
He started posting his own songs on his YouTube channel in 2018, but it was with his single "Pensa Bem" featuring Dylan that he gained his national recognition.

Discography

Singles

As lead artist

Awards

References 

Living people
21st-century Portuguese male singers
1999 births
Portuguese male dancers
People from Seixal
Portuguese rappers
English-language singers from Portugal